Sphodromantis rubrostigma, common name Kenya mantis, is a species of praying mantis found in Kenya and Tanzania.

See also
African mantis
List of mantis genera and species

References

rubrostigma
Mantodea of Africa
Insects described in 1916